Barry Jean Ancelet (pseudonym Jean Arceneaux; born 1951) is a Cajun folklorist in Louisiana French and ethnomusicologist in Cajun music. He has written several books, and under his pseudonym Jean Arceneaux, including poetry and lyrics to songs.

Early life and education 
Born in Church Point, in Acadia Parish, Louisiana on 25 June 1951. He graduated from the University of Southwestern Louisiana (now named the University of Louisiana at Lafayette) with a Bachelor of Arts in French in 1974. He received a Master of Arts in folklore from Indiana University in 1977. Ancelet obtained a doctorate in 1984 in Études Créoles (anthropology and linguistics) from the Université de Provence, (Aix-Marseille I) in Aix-en-Provence, France.

Career

Music festivals 
Ancelet co-founded and acted as the Director the Tribute to Cajun Music, in 1974 and from 1976 to 1980, which became the annual Festivals Acadiens. He has also served as a Director as well as the President and member of the Executive Board for the Festival de Musique Acadienne/Cajun Music Festival since 1980.

Teaching 
He has taught at the University of Louisiana at Lafayette, starting in 1977, first as the Director of the Center for Acadian and Creole Folklore (from 1977 to 1980), as a Professor of Francophone Studies and Folklore (1977 to 1980), and he was a folklorist at the University of Louisiana at Lafayette, Center for Louisiana Studies (from 1980 to 1985).

Ancelet has served as Chair of University of Louisiana at Lafayette's Department of Modern Languages and as the first Director of the university's Center for Acadian and Creole Folklore — regarded as the largest compilation of media resources pertaining to these two south Louisiana ethnic groups.

Other work 
Ancelet hosted the Rendez-vous des Cajuns, a live weekly music radio program on KRVS for more than a decade.

Ancelet has served as the Chairman on the Louisiana Folklife Commission from 1984 to 1990.

Ancelet is a member of many organizations, including the l'Ordre des francophones d'Amérique, in Quebec, Canada; a fellow of the American Folklore Society; and a fellow of the Center for Cultural and Eco-Tourism at University of Louisiana at Lafayette.

Honors and awards 
In 2005, Ancelet was named the Willis Granger and Tom Debaillon BORSF Professor of Francophone Studies at University of Louisiana at Lafayette.

In 2008, he won the Américo Paredes Prize by the American Folklore Society.

In 2009, he was named Louisiana "Humanist of the Year" by the Louisiana Endowment for the Humanities.

Publications

As Jean Arceneaux 
 

 (published in French)

Film

See also
Richard Guidry

References

Further reading

External links 
 
Video: Interview with Barry Jean Ancelet (2018), American Folklife Center, Library of Congress

1951 births
Living people
American male writers
American poets in French
American writers in French
American folklorists
Cajun writers
Indiana University alumni
People from Church Point, Louisiana
University of Louisiana at Lafayette alumni
University of Louisiana at Lafayette faculty
Chevaliers of the Ordre des Arts et des Lettres
Chevaliers of the Ordre des Palmes Académiques
University of Provence alumni